The Hidden Hand is a 1942 comedy horror film directed by Benjamin Stoloff, starring Craig Stevens, Elisabeth Fraser and Julie Bishop.

Plot summary

John Channing (Milton Parsons) is an insane-asylum escapee. In her efforts to protect her brother from the authorities, John's sister Lorinda (Cecil Cunningham) opens the door for a series of grisly murders. Peter Thorne (Craig Stevens) and Mary Winfield (Elizabeth Fraser) try to stop John before he kills again.

Cast

 Craig Stevens as Peter Thorne
 Elisabeth Fraser as Mary Winfield
 Julie Bishop as Rita Channing
 Willie Best as Eustis the Chauffeur
 Frank Wilcox as Dr. Lawrence Channing
 Cecil Cunningham as Lorinda Channing
 Ruth Ford as Estelle Channing
 Milton Parsons as John Channing
 Roland Drew as Walter Channing
 Tom Stevenson as Horace Channing
 Marian Hall as Nurse Eleanor Stevens
 Inez Gay as Hattie (as Inez Gary)
 Kam Tong as Mallo

Home video
In 2010, the film was released as by Warner Archive as part of the six-film DVD-R collection Warner Bros. Horror/Mystery Double Features.

References

External links 

 
 
 
 

1942 films
American black-and-white films
American mystery films
American detective films
American films based on plays
Films directed by Benjamin Stoloff
1942 horror films
Films scored by William Lava
American comedy horror films
1940s comedy horror films
1942 comedy films
1940s English-language films
1940s American films